Angel Falls  (Pemon language: Kerepakupai Merú meaning "waterfall of the deepest place", or Parakupá Vená, meaning "the fall from the highest point") is a waterfall in Venezuela.
The waterfall drops over the edge of the Auyán-tepui mountain in the Canaima National Park (Spanish: Parque Nacional Canaima), a UNESCO World Heritage site in the Gran Sabana region of Bolívar State.

The falls are along a fork of the Río Kerepacupai Merú which flows into the Churún River, a tributary of the Carrao River, itself a tributary of the Orinoco River.

History

Etymology
The waterfall has been known as Angel Falls since the mid-20th century; they are named after Jimmie Angel, a U.S. aviator, who was the first person to fly over the falls. Angel's ashes were scattered over the falls on 2 July 1960.

The common Spanish name Salto Ángel derives from his surname. In 2009, President Hugo Chávez announced his intention to change the name to the purported original indigenous Pemon term ("Kerepakupai-Merú", meaning "waterfall of the deepest place"), on the grounds that the nation's most famous landmark should bear an indigenous name. Explaining the name change, Chávez was reported to have said, "This is ours, long before Angel ever arrived there ... this is indigenous land." However, he later said that he would not decree the change of name, but was only defending the use of Kerepakupai Vená.

Exploration
Sir Walter Raleigh, in his expedition to find the fabled city of El Dorado, described what was possibly a tepui (table top mountain), and he is said to have been the first European to view Angel Falls, although these claims are considered far-fetched. Some historians state that the first European to visit the waterfall was Fernando de Berrío, a Spanish explorer and governor from the 16th and 17th centuries. Other sources state that the first Westerner to see the waterfall was the Spanish explorer Fèlix Cardona in 1927.

They were not known to the outside world until American aviator Jimmie Angel, following directions given by Cardona, flew over them on 16 November 1933 on a flight while he was searching for a valuable ore bed.

Returning on 9 October 1937, Angel tried to land his Flamingo monoplane El Río Caroní atop Auyán-tepui, but the plane was damaged when the wheels sank into the marshy ground. Angel and his three companions, including his wife Marie, were forced to descend the tepui on foot. It took them 11 days to make their way back to civilization by the gradually sloping back side, but news of their adventure spread and the waterfall was named Angel Falls in his honor. The name of the waterfall—"Salto del Ángel"—was first published on a Venezuelan government map in December 1939.

Angel's plane remained on top of the tepui for 33 years before being lifted out by helicopter. It was restored at the Aviation Museum in Maracay and now sits outdoors on the front of the airport at Ciudad Bolívar.

The first recorded European to reach the base of the falls was the Latvian explorer Aleksandrs Laime, also known as Alejandro Laime to the native Pemon tribe. He reached the falls alone in 1946. He was the first to reach the upper side of the falls in the late 1950s, by climbing up the back side, where the slope is not vertical. He also reached Angel's plane 18 years after the crash landing. On 18 November 1955, Latvian independence day, he announced to the Venezuelan newspaper El Nacional that this stream without any known local name should be named after a Latvian river, Gauja. The same year, this name was registered in the National Cartographic Institution of Venezuela. There is no convincing proof that the indigenous Pemon people had named the local streams, as Auyán-tepui was considered to be a dangerous place and was not visited by the indigenous people. However, lately the Pemon name Kerep is used as well.

Laime was also the first to clear a trail that leads from the Churún River to the base of the falls. On the way is a viewpoint commonly used to capture the falls in photographs. It is named Mirador Laime ("Laime's Viewpoint" in Spanish) in his honor. This trail is used now mostly for tourists, to lead them from the Isla Ratón camp to the small clearing.

The official height of the falls was determined by a survey carried out by an expedition organized and financed by American journalist Ruth Robertson on 13 May 1949. Robertson's expedition, which began on 23 April 1949, was also the first to reach the foot of the falls. The first known attempt to climb the face of the cliff was made in 1968 during the wet season. It failed because of slippery rock. In 1969, a second attempt was made during the dry season. This attempt was thwarted by lack of water and an overhang  from the top. The first climb to the top of the cliff was completed on 13 January 1971. The climbers, a four-man team led by American mountaineer George Bogel, an electrical engineer from Pittsburgh, Pennsylvania,  required nine and a half days to ascend and one and a half days to rappel down.

Tourism
Angel Falls is one of Venezuela's top tourist attractions, though a trip to the falls is a complicated affair. The falls are located in an isolated jungle. A flight from Maiquetia Airport or Puerto Ordaz or Ciudad Bolívar is required to reach Canaima camp, the starting point for river trips to the base of the falls. River trips generally take place from June to December, when the rivers are deep enough for use by the Pemon guides. During the dry season (December to March), there is less water seen than in the other months.

See also
List of waterfalls by height

References

External links

 Salto-angel.com

Geography of Bolívar (state)
Orinoco basin
Rivers of Venezuela
Waterfalls of Venezuela
Plunge waterfalls
Canaima National Park